Call boy may refer to:

Call boy (theatre), a stagehand who alerts actors and actresses of their entrances during a performance
Male prostitute or callboy, a man who sells his body to people
Call Boy (horse), a Thoroughbred horse, winner of The Derby in 1927
Call Boy, a standardbred harness-racing horse, winner of the Great Northern Derby in 1958